Mahyat Shafapour Tehrany (born July 29, 1985), is an Iranian geomatic engineer specializing in GIS, natural hazards and data analysis.

Life 
Mahyat Shafapour Tehrany was born on July 29, 1985 in Tehran, Iran. In 2008, she completed a B.S. in environmental engineering, majoring in natural resources engineering and the environment at the Allameh Mohaddes Nouri University. In 2013, she earned a M.S. in remote sensing and geographic information system (GIS) at the Universiti Putra Malaysia (UPM). She earned a Ph.D. in GIS and geomatic engineering at UPM in 2015.

She was a postdoctoral fellow at UPM from October 2015 to February 2016 where she researched natural hazards using multispectral imagery. From April 2016 to March 2017, Tehrany was a research assistant at the University of New England where she worked on GIS data analysis and spatial data. She was a postdoctoral fellow studied natural hazards in Australia at the RMIT School of Science from March 2017 to February 2019. From March 2019 to June 2019, she conducted postdoctoral research at the Kandilli Observatory at the Boğaziçi University.

Selected works

References

External links 

 

Living people
1985 births
People from Tehran
Iranian engineers
Iranian women engineers
21st-century women engineers
Geomatics
University of Putra Malaysia alumni